The fifth edition of the Strade Bianche Donne was held on 9 March 2019. Dutch rider Annemiek van Vleuten won the race after breaking clear on the final gravel sector. Denmark's Annika Langvad finished second, Poland's Kasia Niewiadoma third. Starting and finishing in Siena, Italy, it was the opening event of the 2019 UCI Women's World Tour.

The race was run in sunny weather and mild temperatures.

Teams
123 participants from 21 teams entered the race. Each team had a maximum of six riders:

Results

References

External links
 

Strade Bianche
Strade Bianche
Strade Bianche
Strade Bianche Women